Statistics of Dhivehi League in the 1996 season.

Overview
Club Lagoons won the championship.

References
RSSSF

Dhivehi League seasons
Maldives
Maldives
football